The 1982 Aerocondor DHC-4 Caribou accident happened on 1 September 1982 when a twin-engined de Havilland Canada DHC-4 Caribou (registered in Ecuador as HC-BHZ) on an internal scheduled passenger flight operated by Aerolíneas Cóndor (Aerocondor) from Zumba Airport to Loja Airport collided with high ground in the Andes in bad weather. The terrain and weather hindered the search and rescue operations, and helicopters did not reach the accident site until 4 September 1982; all 44 on board were killed.

Aircraft
The aircraft was a de Havilland Canada DHC-4 Caribou twin-engined piston transport that had been built in Canada in 1967.

References
Citations

Bibliography

External links
Aviation Safety Network

Accidents and incidents involving the de Havilland Canada DHC-4 Caribou
Aviation accidents and incidents in Ecuador
Aviation accidents and incidents in 1982
1982 in Ecuador
September 1982 events in South America
Airliner accidents and incidents involving controlled flight into terrain
Airliner accidents and incidents caused by weather
1982 disasters in Ecuador